Max Planck Institute for Multidisciplinary Sciences is a research institute of the Max Planck Society, located in Göttingen, Germany. It was formed on January 1, 2022, through a merger of Max Planck Institute for Biophysical Chemistry and Max Planck Institute for Experimental Medicine.

See also
 List of Max Planck Institutes

References

External links
 Official website 

Max Planck Institutes
Medical research institutes in Germany
Biological research institutes
Biophysics organizations
Göttingen